Old Riska Church is a parish church of the Church of Norway in the large Sandnes municipality in Rogaland county, Norway. It is located in the village of Hommersåk in the borough of Riska, east of the centre of the city of Sandnes in the western part of the municipality. It is one of the two churches for the Riska parish which is part of the Sandnes prosti (deanery) in the Diocese of Stavanger. The white, wooden church was built in a long church design in 1877 using plans drawn up by the architects Hans Linstow and Henrik Nissen. The church seats about 200 people.

Over time, the church became too small for the parish. In 1999, the church was retired from regular use when the new, much larger Riska Church was completed (about a block to the northeast). Since that time, this church is only used for special occasions.

Media gallery

See also
List of churches in Rogaland

References

Sandnes
Churches in Rogaland
Wooden churches in Norway
19th-century Church of Norway church buildings
Churches completed in 1877
1877 establishments in Norway